George Ruebner (born 3 August 1942) is an Australian former rugby union and rugby league footballer.

George Ruebner, a wing, was born in Shanghai came from Randwick DRUFC and claimed a total of 2 international caps for Australia in 1966.

He switched to Rugby League the following year and played 55 career games for the Balmain Tigers for five seasons between 1967 and 1971, winning the 1969 NSWRFL premiership with them.

He represented New South Wales in two games against Queensland in 1968. He retired in 1972.

References

1942 births
Living people
Australian rugby league players
Australian rugby union players
Australia international rugby union players
Balmain Tigers players
Chinese emigrants to Australia
New South Wales rugby league team players
Sportspeople from Shanghai
Rugby league wingers
Rugby union wings